Imperial f.f.r.r. is the sixth studio album by Washington, D.C. indie rock band Unrest, released on March 16, 1992 by No.6 Records and TeenBeat Records.

Accolades

Track listing

Personnel
Adapted from the Imperial f.f.r.r. liner notes.

Unrest
Bridget Cross – bass guitar, backing vocals
Phil Krauth – drums, bells, backing vocals, production
Mark Robinson – vocals, electric guitar, twelve-string guitar, sampler, bells, production

Production and additional personnel
Wharton Tiers – production, engineering, recording
Terry Tolkin  – recording
Trevor Kampmann  – remastering

Release history

References

External links 
 

1992 albums
Albums produced by Mark Robinson (musician)
Albums produced by Wharton Tiers
TeenBeat Records albums
Unrest (band) albums